Banca Popolare di Brescia S.c.r.l. (Bipop) was an Italian cooperative bank based in Brescia, Lombardy. In 1999 the bank merged with Cassa di Risparmio di Reggio Emilia.

According to Mediobanca, the bank was ranked 30th in terms of client deposits in 1998 (€5,735,732 thousands). In 1999, the bank had a share capital of 600,847,375,000 lire (about €310 million).

History
Banca Popolare di Brescia was found in 1983 by the merger of Banca Popolare di Lumezzane and Banca Popolare di Palazzolo. The bank was the parent company of Fineco Holding (77.4% stake in 1994). The bank acquired Cisalpina Gestioni from Area Gestioni Finanziarie (30%), Area Consult SIM (6.15%), Banca Popolare di Intra (13.65%), Banca Popolare di Luino e Varese (13.65%) and Banca Popolare di Abbiategrasso (13.65%) in 1994 (renamed to Fineco Gestioni SGR in 2002; merged with Fineco Asset Management SGR in 2004; renamed to Capitalia Asset Management SGR on 1 January 2006).

In 1999 the bank merged with Cassa di Risparmio di Reggio Emilia to form Bipop Carire. On 1 July 2012 Bipop Carire was merged with Banca di Roma to form Capitalia, which was acquired by UniCredit in 2007.

See also
 Banco di Brescia
 Banca Credito Cooperativo di Brescia
 Cassa Padana
 Banca di Valle Camonica
 Banca del Territorio Lombardo
 Banca Valsabbina

References

Capitalia Group
Banks established in 1983
Banks disestablished in 1999
Italian companies disestablished in 1999
Companies based in Brescia
Defunct cooperative banks of Italy
Italian companies established in 1983